La Gueule de l'autre is a French comedy film with a satirical look at political values.

Synopsis
The film starts in 1978 Paris. In the middle of the presidential election, Martial Perrin, president of the "parti centriste des Conservateurs Indépendants Progressistes" (CIP), learns that Richard Krauss, an old mercenary convicted for taking violent action against the Djibouti government when the latter was still a French colony, has escaped from prison. In his trial, he had publicly promised to kill every man who had stood in the way of his Coup d'état. Martial Perrin is one of those men.

Hours after Krauss' escape, the first murders in his old entourage are announced. Martial Perrin is now so terrified that he acts like a tracked animal: staying away from the windows and sources of light, exiting his home only by back doors, not even wanting to make public speeches. His behavior quickly becomes a standing joke among his fellow politicians and rivals. Therefore, Jean-Louis Constant, his councilor, advises him to be replaced by his cousin and look-alike, Gilbert Brossard, until the Krauss is caught and imprisoned. The latter finds out that not only is his task amusing, but it is also the perfect way to fool the police, population, politicians and even his cousin's wife in bed! A face-to-face meeting is organised with a spokesman of a rival political party, in which Brossard will have to use every last bit of his talent to imitate the great Perrin...whilst being as pathetic as the real one. Will the killer be fooled by this subterfuge? That is the question.

Actors and Characters
Michel Serrault : Martial Perrin / Gilbert Brossard
Andréa Parisy : Marie-Hélène Perri
Jean Poiret : Jean-Louis Constant
Bernadette Lafont : Gisèle Brossard
Curd Jürgens : Wilfrid
Roger Carel : Roland Favereau
Georges Géret : The inspector Javert
Catherine Lachens : Florence
Francis Lax : The inspector Statino
Jacques Legras : Hervé Bidart
Clément Michu : Boireau
Hans Meyer : Richard Krauss
Bernard Lavalette : Monsieur le Comte de Chalosse
Marco Perrin : Raoul Garrivier
François Lalande : Michel Bertheau
Jacqueline Jehanneuf : Emma Sardieu
Paulette Dubost : Mrs. Chalebouis
Robert Destain : Marcel Berthomier
Maurice Travail : Jean-Luc Ferrari
Rose Thiéry : Thérèse
Michel Blanc : Taboureau
Odile Mallet : Madame de la Tournerie
Dominique Lavanant : The abused woman in the hotel room
Pierre Douglas : The Host of "Face à face"
Dorothée : The announcer
Lily Fayol : Gisèle Brossard's mother
Jacques Deschamps : The TV director's Voice
Germaine Delbat : Madame Perrin
Robert Rollis : The sound engineer
Pierre Tchernia : Narrator
Albert Augier : The principal Inspector
Marcelle Ranson-Hervé : The Minister
Colette Brosset : The tango student
Patrick Poivre d'Arvor : Himself
Stéphane Paoli : Himself
Gabriel Cattand
Michel Fortin
Jerry Di Giacomo
Peter Semler
Jean Ory
Claude Legros
Gérard Loussine

External links
 

French comedy films
1970s French-language films
1979 films
1970s French films